Philip Antony Corri (also Arthur Clifton; 1784–1832) was a composer, born in Edinburgh and later working in London and Baltimore, Maryland.  He began composing in 1802.  He helped to found the London Philharmonic Society and the Royal Academy of Music.

By the 1820s, however, Corri had adopted the name Arthur Clifton and settled in Baltimore, where he was a church organist and active in the local theater.  He wrote on music teaching methods and composed various pieces, most importantly an opera called The Enterprise.

References
University of Nebraska - Kearney

Scottish composers
1784 births
1832 deaths
19th-century Scottish musicians
19th-century British composers
19th-century American composers
19th-century British male musicians
19th-century American male musicians
Musicians from Edinburgh
Scottish emigrants to the United States